Tasmanian Airways Pty. Ltd. was a Hobart, Tasmania-based company registered on 10 December 1926 with the intention of operating aerial services between Tasmania and Victoria.

History
Its main proprietor was F. F. De Mey, who was also proprietor of Tasmanian Motor Service Co. Pty. Ltd. and President of the Commercial Motor Users Association of Tasmania. Two years later it proposed to open a Bass Strait service using a three-engined floatplane (possibly an Avro 618 Ten). It failed attract sufficient capital, but in 1929 chartered a De Havilland Gipsy Moth for a promotional flight from Adelaide to Brisbane. Early in 1934 it acquired  a De Havilland Hawk Moth VH-UNW from the Hart Aircraft Service. Renamed City of Hobart, this aircraft was initially used for joy flights out of Brighton, Tasmania but from August 1934 operated a regular passenger service between Brighton and Launceston, Tasmania connecting with Tasmanian Aerial Service's Launceston-Bass Strait Islands-Melbourne services. These ceased on 10 January 1935, after a piston-rod failure damaged City of Hobart 's engine beyond repair and resulted in a forced landing at Brighton. The engineless aircraft was sold in mid-1936, and the company was later liquidated.

Fleet
 Avro 618 Ten
 De Havilland Gipsy Moth
 De Havilland Hawk Moth

See also
List of defunct airlines of Australia
 Aviation in Australia

References

Companies based in Hobart
Defunct airlines of Australia